Heinz-Jürgen Blome (14 December 1946  – 7 November 2012) was a German association football defender.

Career

Statistics

1 1969–70 and 1970–71 include the Regionalliga promotion playoffs.

References

External links
 

1946 births
2012 deaths
German footballers
Bundesliga players
VfL Bochum players
Association football defenders